Herbert Olofsson (8 April 1910 – 1 December 1978) was a Swedish wrestler. He competed in the men's Greco-Roman lightweight at the 1936 Summer Olympics.

References

External links
 

1910 births
1978 deaths
Swedish male sport wrestlers
Olympic wrestlers of Sweden
Wrestlers at the 1936 Summer Olympics
People from Landskrona Municipality
Sportspeople from Skåne County
20th-century Swedish people